The Chunichi Building is located in Sakae, Nagoya in central Japan.

It is located facing the Hisaya Ōdori Park. 
Officially it is called the Chūbu Nippon Building, but is commonly known as the Chunichi Building.

It houses amongst many other things the Chunichi Theatre.

References

External links 

 Homepage of the Chunichi Building

Buildings and structures in Nagoya